Club de Fútbol La Nucía is a Spanish football team based in La Nucía, in the autonomous community of Valencia. Founded in 1995, it plays in Primera División RFEF – Group 2, holding home games at Estadio Camilo Cano, which has a capacity of 3,000 spectators.

Team colours are red shirt, black shorts and socks.

History
Club de Fútbol La Nucía rose from the ashes of several teams that were successively created in the city, receiving this denomination in 1995. In 1998–99, the club promoted to the first regional division for the first time, returning again to that level five years later.

The 2006–07 season was full of unexpected events. After qualifying to the promotion playoffs for Tercera División, La Nucía was eliminated by CD Olímpic de Xàtiva (1–1 draw in the first leg and 0–1 loss in the second). During the summer, however, Club de Fútbol Dolores forfeited its berth in the competition, with La Nucía occupying its place, with a first-ever promotion to the national categories.

In its first season in the fourth division, La Nucía finished in third position in the regular season, thus qualifying for the promotion playoffs, being eliminated by UD Las Palmas Atlético (1–1 at home, 1–2 away loss). The team met the same fate in the following campaign, being ousted by RSD Alcalá in the third round (0–2 on aggregate).

On 30 June 2019, La Nucía achieved their first promotion ever to the third division after beating Linares in the last round of the promotion playoffs, with a latest goal in the 93rd minute. It was scored by San Julián, who gave the historic promotion to the club in the last game of his entire career.

Season to season

1 season in Primera División RFEF
2 seasons in Segunda División B
1 season in Segunda División RFEF
10 seasons in Tercera División

Players

Current squad
.

Reserve team

Out of loan

Former Managers
 Manuel Jiménez González (1986–87)
 Pepe Soler (2009–11)
 Miguel Ángel Martínez (2018–19)
  César Ferrando (2018) (2019-23)

References

External links
Official website 
Futbolme team profile 
Club & stadium history 

Football clubs in the Valencian Community
Association football clubs established in 1995
1995 establishments in Spain
Primera Federación clubs